François Imbeau-Dulac (born 9 December 1990) is a Canadian diver.

He began diving at the age of 9, and began competing internationally in 2006.

In 2011 Imbeau-Dulac broke the Canadian record (held at the time by Alexandre Despatie) in the 1m springboard event. He competed in the 3 m springboard event at the 2012 Summer Olympics. He placed 13th, just short of making the final.  He competed in the 3 m springboard and the 1 m springboard events at the 2014 Commonwealth Games. With Jennifer Abel, he won the silver medal in the 3 m mixed synchronised diving at the 2015 World Aquatics Championship. At the 2017 World Aquatics Championship, he and Abel again won a medal in the mixed synchronised diving event, this time bronze.

At the 2018 Commonwealth Games, he competed in the men's 3 m springboard event and the men's 3 m synchronised springboard event, winning the silver medal with Philippe Gagne. At the 2019 World Aquatics Championship, Imbeau-Dulac and Abel won their third World Championship synchronised diving medal in a row, winning the silver medal.

In an attempt to qualify for the 2012 Summer Olympics, around 2010, Imbeau-Dulac developed an eating disorder which involved purging.  Realizing that he needed help, Imbeau-Dulac spoke to his coach after the Olympics and immediately received help from Diving Canada and a mental health professional.  He has since returned to a healthy lifestyle, and would like to compete in the 2020 Summer Olympics in Tokyo, Japan.

References

External links
 
 
 
 
 
 
 
 

1990 births
Living people
Canadian male divers
Olympic divers of Canada
World Aquatics Championships medalists in diving
Pan American Games medalists in diving
Pan American Games silver medalists for Canada
Commonwealth Games medallists in diving
Commonwealth Games silver medallists for Canada
Divers at the 2011 Pan American Games
Divers at the 2012 Summer Olympics
Divers at the 2014 Commonwealth Games
Divers at the 2015 Pan American Games
Divers at the 2018 Commonwealth Games
Divers at the 2019 Pan American Games
Medalists at the 2015 Pan American Games
Medalists at the 2019 Pan American Games
French Quebecers
Divers from Quebec City
20th-century Canadian people
21st-century Canadian people
Medallists at the 2018 Commonwealth Games